Anacimas is a genus of horse flies in the family Tabanidae.

Species
Anacimas dodgei (Whitney, 1879)
Anacimas limbellatus Enderlein, 1923

References

Tabanidae
Brachycera genera
Diptera of North America
Taxa named by Günther Enderlein